Troisdorf station is a railway junction in the town of Troisdorf in the German state of North Rhine-Westphalia, where the line from Cologne separates into the East Rhine Railway to Neuwied and the Sieg Railway to Siegen. In addition to various regional rail services Troisdorf is served by the S 12 and S 13. Both lines operate towards Cologne at 20-minute intervals, so together they provide a 10-minute-interval S-Bahn service to Cologne. It is also served on working days by the S 19 service between Düren and Au (Sieg), running hourly and substituting for one of the S13 services. It is classified by Deutsche Bahn as a category 3 station.

The Cologne–Frankfurt high-speed line also passes through Troisdorf, but without stopping. In the course of the construction of high-speed line, the three platforms were rebuilt and raised. Renovation or replacement of the station building is being planned.

References

Railway stations in North Rhine-Westphalia
Rhine-Ruhr S-Bahn stations
S12 (Rhine-Ruhr S-Bahn)
S13 (Rhine-Ruhr S-Bahn)
Railway stations in Germany opened in 1861
1861 establishments in Prussia
Buildings and structures in Rhein-Sieg-Kreis